"You Didn't Have to Be So Nice" is a song by American rock band the Lovin' Spoonful from their 1966 album Daydream. It was first issued as a single in November 1965 and reached number 10 on the Billboard Hot 100 in January 1966.  According to its writer, band bassist and songwriter Steven Boone, it was inspired by 1960s celebrity photographer Nurit Wilde.

Billboard described the song as having a "good lyric and strong dance beat."  Cash Box described it as a "catchy cut" with "a sweet romantic touch."

The song has been cited as an inspiration for the composition of the 1966 song "God Only Knows" by the Beach Boys.

Covers
 1966 – The Grass Roots on their first album, Where Were You When I Needed You.
 1967 – Astrud Gilberto on her fifth album, Beach Samba.
 1997 – Amy Grant & Kevin Costner in Costner's film The Postman 
 2014 – Nick Vernier Band

References

1965 songs
1966 singles
The Lovin' Spoonful songs
Songs written by John Sebastian
Song recordings produced by Erik Jacobsen
Kama Sutra Records singles